Garcinia hombroniana or Seashore Mangosteen  is a species of mangosteen found in Malaysia, Cambodia, Thailand and Vietnam in coastal forest

References

External links
 
 

hombroniana